"Banal Sojourn" is a poem from Wallace Stevens's first book of poetry, Harmonium. It was originally published in 1919, therefore it is in the public domain.

Interpretation
About this poem Stevens wrote, "Banal Sojourn" is a poem of (exhaustion in August!) [Stevens' parenthesis]. The mildew of any late season, of any experience that has grown monotonous as, for instance, the experience of life. Harold Bloom responds: "Stevens, with only rare exceptions, did not comment very usefully upon his own poems. This is not one of the exceptions."  Bloom suggests that the poet feels acutely the universal nostalgia that he is now a touch old to be what clearly he never was, a "princox", a roaring boy or saucy fellow....What the poem shows...is Stevens' anxiety that the poetic voice in him may fail, an anxiety rendered more acute by an imaginative maturity so long delayed."

Challenging Bloom's interpretation, Kia Penso writes, "There is no evidence in the letters or elsewhere to suggest that Stevens suffered from the kind of anxiety that Bloom ascribes to him.". (Evidently she does not consider "Monocle de Mon Oncle" to be such evidence.) She calls Bloom to account for reading the line that begins with "Pardie!" and the following lines "as being about Stevens himself feeling fat and old. And green."

Notes

References 
 Buttel, Robert. Wallace Stevens: The Making of Harmonium. 1967: Princeton University Press.
 Cook, Eleanor. A Reader's Guide to Wallace Stevens. 2007: Princeton University Press.
 Penso, Kia. Wallace Stevens, Harmonium and the Whole of Harmonium. 1991: Anchor Books.

1919 poems
American poems
Poetry by Wallace Stevens